Central Bedfordshire is a unitary authority area in the ceremonial county of Bedfordshire, England. It was created in 2009.

Formation
Central Bedfordshire was created on 1 April 2009 as part of a structural reform of local government in Bedfordshire. The Bedfordshire County Council and all the district councils in the county were abolished, with new unitary authorities created providing the services which had been previously delivered by both the district and county councils. Central Bedfordshire was created covering the area of the former Mid Bedfordshire and South Bedfordshire Districts.

The local authority is called Central Bedfordshire Council.

Towns and villages

Central Bedfordshire comprises a mix of market towns and rural villages. The largest town is Dunstable followed by Leighton Buzzard and Houghton Regis. Dunstable and Houghton Regis form part of the Luton/Dunstable urban area. Central Bedfordshire includes the following towns and villages.

Ampthill (town)
Arlesey (town)
Aspley Guise
Barton-le-Clay
Biggleswade (town)
Blunham
Broom
Caddington
Campton
Clifton
Clophill
Chalton
Chicksands
Cranfield
Dunstable (town)
Dunton
Eaton Bray
Eversholt
Fairfield
Flitton
Flitwick (town)
Greenfield
Harlington
Haynes
Heath and Reach
Henlow
Higham Gobion
Houghton Conquest
Houghton Regis (town)
Husborne Crawley
Kensworth
Langford
Leighton Buzzard (town)
Lidlington
Linslade (town)
Marston Moretaine
Maulden
Meppershall
Millbrook
Northill
Old Warden
Pepperstock
Potton (town)
Pulloxhill
Ridgmont
Sandy (town)
Shefford (town)
Silsoe
Shillington
Slip End
Southill
Stanford
Steppingley
Stotfold
Sutton
Tebworth
Tempsford
Toddington
Westoning
Wingfield
Wixams (new town, partly in Central Bedfordshire and partly in the Borough of Bedford)
Woburn
Woodside

See also
 List of places in Bedfordshire

References

External links
 Central Bedfordshire Council Website

 
Local government districts of Bedfordshire
Unitary authority districts of England
English unitary authorities created in 2009
Local government in Bedfordshire